Chariesthes nigronotata is a species of beetle in the family Cerambycidae. It was described by Stephan von Breuning in 1956. It is known from South Africa.

References

Chariesthes
Beetles described in 1956